Mark XVIII or Mark 18 often refers to the 18th version of a product, frequently military hardware. "Mark", meaning "model" or "variant", can be abbreviated "Mk." 

Mark XVIII or Mark 18 can specifically refer to:

In technology

In military and weaponry
De Havilland Mosquito NF Mk XVIII; a Royal Air Force night fighter radar modification
De Havilland Mosquito FB Mk XVIII, also called Tsetse; RAF ground-attack aircraft carrying a QF 6 pounder (57 mm) anti-tank gun
Supermarine Spitfire Mk 18; a further development of the Mk XIV, arriving too late to serve in World War II
Mark 18 torpedo, 1944 US Navy electric torpedo
Mark 18 nuclear bomb; 1953 American nuclear bomb
CQBR Mark 18 Mod 0; a modification of the M4 Carbine
Mk 18 Mod 0 grenade launcher; former US Navy grenade launcher

Other uses
Bolo Gladius model XVIII, artificially intelligent tank imagined by author Keith Laumer